The Incredible Journey of Doctor Meg Laurel is a 1979 American made-for-television medical drama film directed by Guy Green, starring Lindsay Wagner and Jane Wyman (credited as Miss Jane Wyman) with a supporting cast including Andrew Duggan, Gary Lockwood, Brock Peters, John Reilly, Dorothy McGuire and James Woods. The film was originally broadcast on CBS on January 2, 1979.

Plot
In 1932, Meg Laurel, a bold-spirited doctor who graduates Harvard Medical School, gives up the comfort and security of her husband, home, and her practice in Boston. Her mission is to return to her hometown in the Blue Ridge Mountains and help the Appalachian people using modern medical techniques she learned in the big city.

Meg's quest meets bitter opposition, however, by those unprepared to give up their antiquated ways for her miracle drugs. Administering medical aid to the residents of Eagle's Nest is a dramatic struggle, as Meg becomes the rival of Granny Arrowroot, a local medicine woman who is not pleased with Meg's arrival and does not trust the modern science. Tragedy nears when one man's refusal to accept Meg's methods of doctoring for his ailing daughter almost brings ruin to Meg's plans and the death of his child.

Cast
Lindsay Wagner as Meg Laurel
Jane Wyman as Granny Arrowroot
Andrew Duggan as Judge Adamson
Gary Lockwood as Harley Moon
Brock Peters as Joe
John Reilly as Thom Laurel
Charles Tyner as Doug Slocumb
James Woods as Sin Eater
Dorothy McGuire as Effie Webb
Woodrow Parfrey as Messerschmidt
Peggy Walton-Walker as Mrs. Slocumb
Kath Soucie as Becca
Tracey Gold as Laurie Mae Moon

Home media
On March 4, 2011, The Incredible Journey of Doctor Meg Laurel was released on DVD in Region 1. This is a Manufacture-on-Demand (MOD) release, available exclusively in the US as part of the Sony Pictures Choice Collection in partnership with Warner Bros. online store.

External links

1979 television films
1979 films
1979 drama films
American drama films
1970s English-language films
CBS network films
Films set in the 1930s
Films set in 1932
Films set in Appalachia
Medical-themed films
Fictional physicians
Films shot in California
Films directed by Guy Green
Films scored by Gerald Fried
1970s American films